Marcelo José de Lima Filho (born 11 December 2002), commonly known as Marcelinho, is a Brazilian footballer who currently plays as a forward for Cruzeiro.

Career statistics

Club

Notes

References

2002 births
Living people
Brazilian footballers
Association football forwards
Campeonato Brasileiro Série A players
Atlético Clube Goianiense players
Sociedade Esportiva Palmeiras players